Freedom First is the name of a monthly magazine in English which was published by the Indian Committee for Cultural Freedom and was established by Minoo Masani in Mumbai. The magazine was first published in June 1952. It was edited by S. V. Raju, and it published articles primarily with a liberal slant. It stands for minimum government and maximum freedom, tempered by a sense of individual responsibility, in which the people's genius has a fair opportunity to develop and grow. In July 2015 the print version was ended and the magazine went on online.

References

External links
 Official web site 

Defunct magazines published in India
Defunct political magazines
Monthly magazines published in India
Online magazines published in India
Political magazines published in India
Libertarianism in India
Magazines established in 1952
Magazines disestablished in 2015
Mass media in Mumbai
Online magazines with defunct print editions